The Tate-Senftenberg-Brandon House is a historic house in Columbus, Texas.  

The home was constructed in 1867 as a single story frame residence by local entrepreneur Phocion Tate.  Tate's widow sold the house in 1887 to Adolph Senftenberg, a local merchant who added the second floor and Eastlake style porches.  The property was sold again in 1900 to Kenneth Brandon who added modern amenities to the property.  

The house operated as a historic house museum from 1968 to 2006. The home is the birthplace of former Dallas mayor, J. Waddy Tate.

References

Historic house museums in Texas
Houses completed in 1867
Victorian architecture in Texas
Recorded Texas Historic Landmarks